Chris Bush may refer to:

 Chris Bush (playwright) (born 1986), British playwright and artistic director of White Rose Theatre
 Chris Bush (Australian soccer) (born 1992), Australian football (soccer) player for Dapto Dandaloo Fury
 Chris Bush (American football) (born 1981), American and Canadian football player
 Chris Bush (English footballer) (born 1992), English footballer for Bromley
Chris Bush (boat racer), 1988 winner of the Formula 1 Powerboat World Grand Prix